Donato Laurenti (died 1584) was a Roman Catholic prelate who served as Bishop of Ariano (1563–1584)  and Bishop of Minori (1557–1563).

Biography
On 21 June 1557, Donato Laurenti was appointed during the papacy of Pope Paul IV as Bishop of Minori.
On 29 January 1563, he was appointed during the papacy of Pope Pius IV as Bishop of Ariano.
He served as Bishop of Ariano until his death in 1584.

References

External links and additional sources
 (for Chronology of Bishops) 
 (for Chronology of Bishops) 
 (for Chronology of Bishops) 
 (for Chronology of Bishops) 

16th-century Italian Roman Catholic bishops
Bishops appointed by Pope Paul IV
Bishops appointed by Pope Pius IV
Bishops of Ariano
1584 deaths